The S13 district lies within in the City of Sheffield, South Yorkshire, England.  The district contains 22 listed buildings that are recorded in the National Heritage List for England.  All the listed buildings are designated at Grade II, the lowest of the three grades, which is applied to "buildings of national importance and special interest".  The district is in the east of the city of Sheffield, and covers the Handsworth, Richmond and Woodhouse areas of the city.

For neighbouring areas, see listed buildings in S2, listed buildings in S9, listed buildings in S12, listed buildings in S20, and listed buildings in Aston cum Aughton.



Buildings

References 

 - A list of all the listed buildings within Sheffield City Council's boundary is available to download from this page.

Sources

 S13
Sheffield S13